The Copa Federação Gaúcha de Futebol, commonly known as the Copa FGF, is an annual cup competition organized by the Rio Grande do Sul state football federation for clubs that are in the first, second and third divisions of the Campeonato Gaúcho. It is held in the second half of the year and usually clubs participating in the higher levels of the Campeonato Brasileiro do not participate with the first team squad, using his academy.

The competition was founded in 2004, being the most important knockout cup competition in Rio Grande do Sul football. The most important league is the Campeonato Gaúcho, played in the first half of the year. It is known to be a competition that values Gaúcho football, because the greatest clubs in the state, Grêmio and Internacional, usually play the cup with their academy teams, opening up the possibility of other clubs win the title.

The Copa FGF usually receive a different name in each edition, honoring important people related to football in Rio Grande do Sul. The 2014 edition is called Copa Fernandão, in posthumous tribute to former Internacional footballer who died in June of the same year.

The current holders are Glória, having beaten Novo Hamburgo in the 2021 finals.

Format

Competition
The competition is a knockout tournament with pairings for first round (round of 22) drawn at random, being the best placed club in the FGF Club Ranking plays the first leg at away. If that club wins by a difference of two or more goals, it will be automatically qualified for the next round. The same rules serves to Round of 12. From the quarter-finals, the order of matches is decided by lot and the second leg is required.

Twenty-two clubs beginning in the round of 22, being the winners and the best loser advancing to the second round. In the round of 12, the winners and the two best losers qualify for the quarter-finals. Thereafter, only the winners advance to the semifinals and the finals.

Qualification for competitions
The Copa FGF winners qualify for the following season's Copa do Brasil. Currently, the competition does not grant more qualifying for the Campeonato Brasileiro Série D, because since the creation of the Super Copa Gaúcha, this new competition received that right for the champion. However, the Copa FGF winner also qualifies for this cup, having the opportunity to qualify for the Campeonato Brasileiro Série D.

Clubs
Having been established in 2004, the Copa FGF has been played by dozens of different clubs in the state of Rio Grande do Sul. The following 22 clubs will compete in the Copa FGF during the 2014 edition.

Champions

Records and statistics

List of champions
Seven clubs are officially recognized to have been the Copa FGF champions, of which four teams have two titles each: Internacional, Juventude, Lajeadense and Novo Hamburgo. 
Below is the complete list of winners and runners-up of the competition.

See also
Campeonato Gaúcho
Campeonato Gaúcho (lower levels)
Copa Metropolitana
Copa Sul-Fronteira
Copa Serrana

References

External links
FGF website. Federação Gaúcha de Futebol.